This is a list of films produced by the Tollywood film industry based in Hyderabad in 1946.

References

External links
 Earliest Telugu language films at IMDb.com (98 to 102)

1946
Telugu
Telugu films

te:తెలుగు సినిమాలు